The 1900–01 Irish Cup was the 21st edition of the premier knock-out cup competition in Irish football.

Cliftonville won the tournament for the fifth time and second year in a row, defeating Freebooters 1–0 in the final.

Results

First round

|}

Second round

|}

Quarter-finals

|}

1 A replay was ordered after a protest.

Replay

|}

Semi-finals

|}

Final

References

External links
 Northern Ireland Cup Finals. Rec.Sport.Soccer Statistics Foundation (RSSSF)

Irish Cup seasons
1900–01 domestic association football cups
1900–01 in Irish association football